Fizeşu Gherlii is a commune in Cluj County, Transylvania, Romania. It is composed of four villages: Bonț (Boncnyíres), Fizeșu Gherlii, Nicula (Füzesmikola) and Săcălaia (Kisszék).
 
Nicula village is the site of Nicula Monastery.

Demographics

According to the 2011 census, Romanians made up 57.9% of the population, Hungarians made up 20.9% and Roma made up 16.1%.

Notes

Communes in Cluj County
Localities in Transylvania